The Abolition of Man is a 1943 book by C. S. Lewis. Subtitled "Reflections on education with special reference to the teaching of English in the upper forms of schools", it uses that as a starting point for a defense of objective value and natural law as well as a warning about the consequences of doing away with them. It defends "man's power over nature" as something worth pursuing but criticizes the use of it to debunk values, the value of science itself being among them. The book was first delivered as a series of three evening lectures at King's College, Newcastle, part of the University of Durham, as the Riddell Memorial Lectures on 24–26 February 1943.

Moral subjectivism vs. natural law
Lewis begins with a critical response to "The Green Book" by "Gaius and Titius": The Control of Language: A Critical Approach to Reading and Writing, published in 1939 by Alexander ("Alec") King and Martin Ketley. The Green Book was used as a text for upper form students in British schools.

Lewis criticises the authors for subverting student values and claims that they teach that all statements of value (such as "this waterfall is sublime") are merely statements about the speaker's feelings and say nothing about the object. Such a view, Lewis argues, makes nonsense of value talk. It implies, for example, that a speaker who condemns some act as contemptible is really only saying, "I have contemptible feelings."

By denying that values are real or that sentiments can be reasonable, subjectivism saps moral motivation and robs people of the ability to respond emotionally to experiences of real goodness and real beauty in literature and in the world. Moreover, Lewis claims that it is impossible to be a consistent moral subjectivist. Even the authors of The Green Book clearly believe that some things, such as improved student learning, are truly good and desirable.

Lewis cites ancient thinkers such as Plato, Aristotle and St. Augustine, who believed that the purpose of education was to train children in "ordinate affections", to train them to like and dislike what they ought and to love the good and hate the bad. Lewis claims that although such values are universal, they do not develop automatically or inevitably in children. Thus, they are not "natural" in that sense of the word, but they must be taught through education. Those who lack them lack the specifically human element, the trunk that unites intellectual man with visceral (animal) man, and they may be called "men without chests".

Men without chests: a dystopian future 

Lewis criticizes modern attempts to debunk natural values, such as those that would deny objective value to the waterfall, on rational grounds. He says that there is a set of objective values that have been shared, with minor differences, by every culture, which he refers to as "the traditional moralities of East and West, the Christian, the Pagan, and the Jew...". Lewis calls that the Tao, from the Taoist word for the ultimate "way" or "path" of reality and human conduct. (Although Lewis saw natural law as supernatural in origin, as evidenced by his use of it as a proof of theism in Mere Christianity, his argument in the book does not rest on theism.)

Without the Tao, no value judgments can be made at all, and modern attempts to do away with some parts of traditional morality for some "rational" reason always proceed by arbitrarily selecting one part of the Tao and using it as grounds to debunk the others.

The final chapter describes the ultimate consequences of this debunking: a not-so distant future in which the values and morals of the majority are controlled by a small group who rule by a perfect understanding of psychology, and who in turn, being able to see through any system of morality that might induce them to act in a certain way, are ruled only by their own unreflected whims. In surrendering rational reflection on their own motivations, the controllers will no longer be recognizably human, the controlled will be robot-like, and the Abolition of Man will have been completed.

An appendix to The Abolition of Man lists a number of basic values seen by Lewis as parts of the Tao, supported by quotations from different cultures.

A fictional treatment of the dystopian project to carry out the Abolition of Man is a theme of Lewis's novel That Hideous Strength.

Passages from The Abolition of Man are included in William Bennett's 1993 book The Book of Virtues.

Modern reviews
National Review ranked the book #7 in its 100 Best Non-Fiction Books of the 20th Century list.  The Intercollegiate Studies Institute ranked the book as the second best book of the 20th century.
In a lecture on Walker Percy, Professor Peter Kreeft of Boston College lists the book as one of six "books to read to save Western Civilization," alongside Lost in the Cosmos by Walker Percy, Mere Christianity by C. S. Lewis, The Everlasting Man by G. K. Chesterton, Orthodoxy by G. K. Chesterton, and Brave New World by Aldous Huxley.

In popular culture 
 Christian hip hop duo Mars ILL named the track "The Abolition of manCHILD" from their 2002 album Raw Material after the book.
 In 2003, the post-hardcore band Thrice based the lyrics of the song "The Abolition of Man" on the book. It is featured in the band's third album, The Artist in the Ambulance.
 The band Point of Recognition also allude to Lewis' book in the lyrics of their song "Abolition of Man".
 TAO, the sixth studio album of Canadian rapper Shad, was heavily inspired by The Abolition of Man.
 In 2022 artist Carson Grubaugh created a comic book adaptation, “Abolition of Man,” using illustrations generated by artificial intelligence. The text of Lewis’ work serves as definitional prompts for the AI’s images.

References

Further reading

 Gregory Bassham, ed., C. S. Lewis's Christian Apologetics: Pro and Con. Leiden: Brill/Rodopi, 2015.

 Jean Beth Elshtain, "The Abolition of Man: C. S. Lewis's Prescience Concerning Things to Come." In David Baggett, Gary R. Habermas, and Jerry L. Walls, eds., C. S. Lewis as Philosopher. Downers Grove, IL: Intervarsity Press, 2008: 85-95.

 C. S. Lewis, "The Poison of Subjectivism." In C. S. Lewis, The Seeing Eye and Other Selected Essays from Christian Reflections. Edited by Walter Hooper. New York: Ballantine Books, 1986: 99-112.

 Gilbert Meilaender, "On Moral Knowledge." In Robert MacSwain and Michael Ward, eds. The Cambridge Companion to C. S. Lewis. New York: Cambridge University Press, 2010: 119-31.

 Timothy M. Moesteller and Gayne John Anacker, eds., Contemporary Perspectives on C. S. Lewis's The Abolition of Man: History, Philosophy, Education, and Science. London: Bloomsbury, 2017.

External links
 
  (with transcriber's footnotes).
  (public domain in Canada, as of 2014).
 .
 .

1943 non-fiction books
Books by C. S. Lewis
Books about education
Books in philosophy of technology
Oxford University Press books